The 2011–12 Chicago Bulls season was the 46th season of the franchise in the National Basketball Association (NBA). The Bulls finished the lockout-shortened season with a 50–16 record, or roughly 62–20 in a full season, tying the San Antonio Spurs for the best record of the season. They ended as the number one seed in the Eastern Conference for a second consecutive season.

Chicago started their playoff run on April 28, taking Game 1 of the first round against the Philadelphia 76ers at the United Center. However, that victory was marred with the season-ending injury of point guard and reigning MVP Derrick Rose, who tore his anterior cruciate ligament in the final minutes of the game. Chicago then lost three games in a row and were also without the services of starting center Joakim Noah for Games 4 and 5 of the series following an injury in his left ankle during Game 3 in Philadelphia. The Bulls won one more game at home before losing the series 2–4 in Philadelphia and became the fifth number one seed in league history to lose a playoffs series against a number eight seed, following the Seattle SuperSonics in 1994, the Miami Heat in 1999, the Dallas Mavericks in 2007, and the San Antonio Spurs in 2011.

Key dates
 June 23: The 2011 NBA draft will take place at Prudential Center in Newark, New Jersey.
 November 1: Chicago Bulls first game of the season, against the Dallas Mavericks was scheduled, but was cancelled due to the lockout.
 December 25: Chicago Bulls first game of the season, against the Los Angeles Lakers. The Bulls won 88–87, in Los Angeles.
 March 24: Chicago secured a spot in the 2012 NBA Playoffs with a 102–101 victory against the Toronto Raptors.
 April 12: The Bulls clinch the Central Division title with a 96–86 win against the Miami Heat.

Summary

NBA draft

Roster

Pre-season

|- style="background:#cfc;"
| 1
| December 16
| @ Indiana
| 95–86
| Derrick Rose,Luol Deng (16)
| Taj Gibson (9)
| Derrick Rose (4)
| Conseco Fieldhouse 14,013
| 1–0
|- style="background:#cfc;"
| 2
| December 20
| Indiana
| 93–85
| Carlos Boozer (24)
| Joakim Noah (8)
| Derrick Rose (9)
| United Center 21,659
| 2–0

Regular season

Standings

Record vs. opponents

Game log

|- style="background:#cfc;"
| 1
| December 25
| @ L. A. Lakers
| 
| Derrick Rose (22)
| Joakim Noah (9)
| Derrick Rose (5)
| Staples Center18,997
| 1–0
|- style="background:#fcc;"
| 2
| December 26
| @ Golden State
| 
| Luol Deng (22)
| Luol DengJoakim Noah (10)
| Derrick Rose (8)
| Oracle Arena19,596
| 1–1
|- style="background:#cfc;"
| 3
| December 29
| @ Sacramento
| 
| Derrick Rose (19)
| Carlos Boozer (15)
| C. J. Watson (9)
| Power Balance Pavilion17,317
| 2–1
|- style="background:#cfc;"
| 4
| December 30
| @ L. A. Clippers
| 
| Derrick Rose (29)
| Derrick Rose (8)
| Derrick Rose (16)
| Staples Center19,426
| 3–1

|- style="background:#cfc;"
| 5
| January 1
| Memphis
| 
| Carlos BoozerRonnie Brewer (17)
| Carlos Boozer (11)
| Derrick Rose (6)
| United Center22,763
| 4–1
|- style="background:#cfc;"
| 6
| January 3
| Atlanta
| 
| Derrick Rose (30)
| Carlos Boozer (9)
| Derrick Rose (7)
| United Center22,166
| 5–1
|- style="background:#cfc;"
| 7
| January 4
| @ Detroit
| 
| Carlos Boozer (19)
| Joakim Noah (11)
| Derrick Rose (10)
| The Palace of Auburn Hills9,125
| 6–1
|- style="background:#cfc;"
| 8
| January 6
| @ Orlando
| 
| Derrick RoseLuol Deng (21)
| Carlos Boozer (13)
| Derrick Rose (10)
| Amway Center18,192
| 7–1
|- style="background:#fcc;"
| 9
| January 7
| @ Atlanta
| 
| John Lucas (16)
| Ömer Aşık (13)
| Derrick Rose (6)
| Philips Arena17,112
| 7–2
|- style="background:#cfc;"
| 10
| January 9
| Detroit
| 
| Carlos Boozer (23)
| Carlos BoozerJoakim Noah (8)
| Derrick Rose (8)
| United Center21,530
| 8–2
|- style="background:#cfc;"
| 11
| January 10
| @ Minnesota
| 
| Derrick Rose (31)
| Luol DengJoakim Noah (11)
| Derrick Rose (11)
| Target Center19,356
| 9–2
|- style="background:#cfc;"
| 12
| January 11
| Washington
| 
| John Lucas (25)
| Luol Deng (15)
| John Lucas (8)
| United Center21,366
| 10–2
|- style="background:#cfc;"
| 13
| January 13
| @ Boston
| 
| Derrick Rose (25)
| Luol Deng (16)
| Derrick Rose (7)
| TD Garden18,624
| 11–2
|- style="background:#cfc;"
| 14
| January 14
| Toronto
| 
| Derrick Rose (18)
| Carlos Boozer (13)
| Derrick Rose (11)
| United Center21,962
| 12–2
|- style="background:#fcc;"
| 15
| January 16
| @ Memphis
| 
| Luol Deng (20)
| Carlos Boozer (7)
| C. J. WatsonLuol Deng (3)
| FedExForum18,119
| 12–3
|- style="background:#cfc;"
| 16
| January 17
| Phoenix
| 
| Carlos Boozer (31)
| Joakim Noah (12)
| Richard HamiltonKyle Korver (6)
| United Center21,347
| 13–3
|- style="background:#cfc;"
| 17
| January 20
| @ Cleveland
| 
| Luol Deng (21)
| Carlos Boozer (14)
| C. J. Watson (7)
| Quicken Loans Arena17,871
| 14–3
|- style="background:#cfc;"
| 18
| January 21
| Charlotte
| 
| Carlos Boozer (23)
| Ömer Aşık (15)
| Mike James (10)
| United Center21,861
| 15–3
|- style="background:#cfc;"
| 19
| January 23
| New Jersey
| 
| Richard Hamilton (22)
| Joakim Noah (10)
| Richard Hamilton (10)
| United Center21,572
| 16–3
|- style="background:#fcc;"
| 20
| January 25
| Indiana
| 
| Derrick Rose (24)
| Joakim Noah (13)
| Ronnie Brewer (5)
| United Center21,755
| 16–4
|- style="background:#cfc;"
| 21
| January 27
| Milwaukee
| 
| Derrick Rose (34)
| Joakim Noah (16)
| Ronnie Brewer (6)
| United Center22,368
| 17–4
|- style="background:#fcc;"
| 22
| January 29
| @ Miami
| 
| Derrick Rose (34)
| Joakim Noah (11)
| Derrick Rose (11)
| American Airlines Arena20,054
| 17–5
|- style="background:#cfc;"
| 23
| January 30
| @ Washington
| 
| Derrick Rose (35)
| Joakim Noah (13)
| Derrick Rose (8)
| Verizon Center18,357
| 18–5

|- style="background:#fcc;"
| 24
| February 1
| @ Philadelphia
| 
| C. J. Watson (20)
| Carlos Boozer (9)
| Derrick Rose (6)
| Wells Fargo Center18,325
| 18–6
|- style="background:#cfc;"
| 25
| February 2
| @ New York
| 
| Derrick Rose (32)
| Carlos BoozerJoakim Noah (9)
| Derrick Rose (13)
| Madison Square Garden19,763
| 19–6
|- style="background:#cfc;"
| 26
| February 4
| @ Milwaukee
| 
| Derrick Rose (26)
| Luol DengJoakim Noah (9)
| Derrick Rose (13)
| Bradley Center18,717
| 20–6
|- style="background:#cfc;"
| 27
| February 6
| @ New Jersey
| 
| Carlos Boozer (24)
| Joakim Noah (12)
| C. J. Watson (11)
| Prudential Center15,327
| 21–6
|- style="background:#cfc;"
| 28
| February 8
| @ New Orleans
| 
| Carlos Boozer (18)
| Joakim Noah (10)
| Derrick Rose (6)
| New Orleans Arena15,456
| 22–6
|- style="background:#cfc;"
| 29
| February 10
| @ Charlotte
| 
| Joakim Noah (17)
| Joakim Noah (14)
| C. J. Watson (5)
| Time Warner Cable Arena19,379
| 23–6
|- style="background:#fcc;"
| 30
| February 12
| @ Boston
| 
| Carlos BoozerC. J. Watson (22)
| Joakim Noah (9)
| Ronnie BrewerC. J. Watson (6)
| TD Garden18,624
| 23–7
|- style="background:#cfc;"
| 31
| February 14
| Sacramento
| 
| Luol Deng (23)
| Joakim Noah (11)
| Luol Deng (11)
| United Center21,936
| 24–7
|- style="background:#cfc;"
| 32
| February 16
| Boston
| 
| Luol DengCarlos Boozer (23)
| Joakim Noah (16)
| Luol Deng (10)
| United Center22,592
| 25–7
|- style="background:#fcc;"
| 33
| February 18
| New Jersey
| 
| Carlos BoozerMike James (16)
| Carlos BoozerTaj Gibson (9)
| Mike James (7)
| United Center22,300
| 25–8
|- style="background:#cfc;"
| 34
| February 20
| Atlanta
| 
| Derrick Rose (23)
| Joakim Noah (16)
| Derrick Rose (6)
| United Center22,033
| 26–8
|- style="background:#cfc;"
| 35
| February 22
| Milwaukee
| 
| Carlos Boozer (20)
| Joakim Noah (13)
| Joakim Noah (10)
| United Center21,507
| 27–8
|- style="text-align:center;"
| colspan="9" style="background:#bbcaff;"|All-Star Break
|- style="background:#cfc;"
| 36
| February 28
| New Orleans
| 
| Derrick Rose (32)
| Joakim Noah (16)
| Derrick Rose (9)
| United Center21,919
| 28–8
|- style="background:#cfc;"
| 37
| February 29
| @ San Antonio
| 
| Derrick Rose (29)
| Joakim Noah (13)
| Derrick RoseC.J. Watson (4)
| AT&T Center18,581
| 29–8

|- style="background:#cfc;"
| 38
| March 2
| @ Cleveland
| 
| Luol Deng (24)
| Carlos Boozer (11)
| Derrick Rose (9)
| Quicken Loans Arena20,562
| 30–8
|- style="background:#cfc;"
| 39
| March 4
| @ Philadelphia
| 
| Derrick Rose (35)
| Joakim Noah (18)
| Derrick Rose (8)
| Wells Fargo Center19,683
| 31–8
|- style="background:#cfc;"
| 40
| March 5
| Indiana
| 
| Luol Deng (20)
| Joakim Noah (17)
| Derrick Rose (9)
| United Center22,106
| 32–8
|- style="background:#cfc;"
| 41
| March 7
| @ Milwaukee
| 
| Derrick Rose (30)
| Joakim Noah (10)
| Derrick Rose (11)
| Bradley Center15,389
| 33–8
|- style="background:#fcc;"
| 42
| March 8
| Orlando
| 
| Carlos Boozer (26)
| Joakim Noah (10)
| Derrick Rose (9)
| United Center22,127
| 33–9
|- style="background:#cfc;"
| 43
| March 10
| Utah
| 
| Carlos Boozer (27)
| Carlos Boozer (8)
| Derrick Rose (13)
| United Center22,158
| 34–9
|- style="background:#cfc;"
| 44
| March 12
| New York
| 
| Derrick Rose (32)
| Taj Gibson (13)
| Derrick RoseRonnie Brewer (7)
| United Center22,863
| 35–9
|- style="background:#cfc;"
| 45
| March 14
| Miami
| 
| John Lucas III (24)
| Carlos BoozerTaj Gibson (8)
| Carlos Boozer (5)
| United Center23,028
| 36–9
|- style="background:#fcc;"
| 46
| March 16
| Portland
| 
| Carlos Boozer (22)
| Carlos Boozer (14)
| Joakim Noah (5)
| United Center22,022
| 36–10
|- style="background:#cfc;"
| 47
| March 17
| Philadelphia
| 
| C.J. Watson (20)
| Joakim Noah (11)
| Joakim NoahTaj Gibson (4)
| United Center22,225
| 37–10
|- style="background:#cfc;"
| 48
| March 19
| @ Orlando
| 
| Carlos Boozer (24)
| Carlos Boozer (13)
| Joakim Noah (5)
| Amway Center18,998
| 38–10
|- style="background:#cfc;"
| 49
| March 21
| @ Toronto
| 
| Luol Deng (17)
| Luol Deng (10)
| Joakim Noah (5)
| Air Canada Centre17,869
| 39–10
|- style="background:#cfc;"
| 50
| March 24
| Toronto
| 
| Carlos Boozer (24)
| Carlos BoozerLuol Deng (10)
| John Lucas III (6)
| United Center21,841
| 40–10
|- style="background:#fcc;"
| 51
| March 26
| Denver
| 
| C.J. Watson (17)
| Carlos BoozerTaj Gibson (7)
| C.J. Watson (8)
| United Center22,274
| 40–11
|- style="background:#cfc;"
| 52
| March 28
| @ Atlanta
| 
| Luol Deng (22)
| Carlos Boozer (9)
| John Lucas III (5)
| Philips Arena16,290
| 41–11
|- style="background:#cfc;"
| 53
| March 30
| Detroit
| 
| Luol Deng (20)
| Joakim Noah (12)
| C.J. Watson (5)
| United Center22,385
| 42–11

|- style="background:#fcc;"
| 54
| April 1
| @ Oklahoma City
| 
| John Lucas III (19)
| Taj Gibson (11)
| Kyle KorverJohn Lucas III (4)
| Chesapeake Energy Arena18,203
| 42–12
|- style="background:#fcc;"
| 55
| April 2
| Houston
| 
| Luol Deng (24)
| Carlos Boozer (13)
| Carlos Boozer (7)
| United Center21,936
| 42–13
|- style="background:#cfc;"
| 56
| April 5
| Boston
| 
| Luol Deng (26)
| Carlos Boozer (14)
| C.J. Watson (8)
| United Center22,423
| 43–13
|- style="background:#fcc;"
| 57
| April 8
| @ New York
| 
| Derrick Rose (29)
| Carlos Boozer (16)
| Derrick Rose (4)
| Madison Square Garden19,763
| 43–14
|- style="background:#cfc;"
| 58
| April 10
| New York
| 
| Richard Hamilton (20)
| Luol Deng (10)
| C.J. Watson (7)
| United Center22,131
| 44–14
|- style="background:#cfc;"
| 59
| April 12
| Miami
| 
| Carlos Boozer (19)
| Carlos Boozer (11)
| C.J. Watson (9)
| United Center23,015
| 45–14
|- style="background:#cfc;"
| 60
| April 15
| @ Detroit
| 
| Derrick Rose (24)
| Joakim Noah (17)
| Derrick Rose (9)
| The Palace of Auburn Hills17,450
| 46–14
|- style="background:#fcc;"
| 61
| April 16
| Washington
| 
| Richard Hamilton (22)
| Carlos Boozer (13)
| C.J. Watson (8)
| United Center22,307
| 46–15
|- style="background:#cfc;"
| 62
| April 18
| @ Charlotte
| 
| Richard Hamilton (22)
| Ömer Aşık (15)
| Richard Hamilton (6)
| Time Warner Cable Arena14,221
| 47–15
|- style="background:#fcc;"
| 63
| April 19
| @ Miami
| 
| John Lucas III (16)
| Joakim Noah (10)
| C.J. WatsonJohn Lucas III (4)
| American Airlines Arena20,008
| 47–16
|- style="background:#cfc;"
| 64
| April 21
| Dallas
| 
| Luol Deng (22)
| Joakim Noah (14)
| Derrick RoseJoakim Noah (8)
| United Center22,945
| 48–16
|- style="background:#cfc;"
| 65
| April 25
| @ Indiana
| 
| Kyle Korver (20)
| Joakim Noah (14)
| Derrick Rose (7)
| Bankers Life Fieldhouse18,165
| 49–16
|- style="background:#cfc;"
| 66
| April 26
| Cleveland
| 
| John Lucas III (25)
| Joakim NoahTaj Gibson (12)
| C.J. Watson (8)
| United Center22,563
| 50–16

Player statistics

Season

|- style="text-align:center;" bgcolor=""
|  || style="background:black;color:white;" | 66 || 2 || 14.7 || .506 || .000 || .456 || 5.3 || 0.5 || 0.45 || 1.03 || 3.1
|-  style="text-align:center; background:#f0f0f0;"
|  || style="background:black;color:white;" | 66 || style="background:black;color:white;" | 66 || 29.5 || style="background:black;color:white;" | .532 || .000 || .693 || 8.5 || 1.9 || 0.95 || 0.36 || 15.0
|- style="text-align:center;" bgcolor=""
|  || style="background:black;color:white;" | 66 || 43 || 24.8 || .427 || .275 || .560 || 3.5 || 2.1 || style="background:black;color:white;" | 1.09 || 0.32 || 6.9
|-  style="text-align:center; background:#f0f0f0;"
|  || 42 || 0 || 8.5 || .405 || .185 || .768 || 1.3 || 0.3 || 0.26 || 0.12 || 2.6
|- style="text-align:center;" bgcolor=""
|  || 54 || 54 || style="background:black;color:white;" | 39.4 || .412 || .367 || .770 || 6.5 || 2.9 || 1.04 || 0.67 || 15.3
|-  style="text-align:center; background:#f0f0f0;"
|  || 63 || 0 || 20.4 || .495 || .000 || .622 || 5.3 || 0.7 || 0.43 || 1.29 || 7.7
|- style="text-align:center;" bgcolor=""
|  || 28 || 28 || 24.9 || .452 || .370 || .784 || 2.4 || 3.0 || 0.43 || 0.04 || 11.6
|-  style="text-align:center; background:#f0f0f0;"
|  || 11 || 0 || 10.9 || .408 || style="background:black;color:white;" | .600 || style="background:black;color:white;" | .875 || 0.9 || 2.6 || 0.36 || 0.18 || 4.8
|-  style="text-align:center; background:#f0f0f0;"
|  || 65 || 7 || 22.6 || .432 || .435 || .833 || 2.4 || 1.7 || 0.55 || 0.23 || 8.1
|- style="text-align:center;" bgcolor=""
|  || 49 || 2 || 14.8 || .399 || .393 || .867 || 1.6 || 2.2 || 0.39 || 0.02 || 7.5
|-  style="text-align:center; background:#f0f0f0;"
|  || 64 || 64 || 30.4 || .508 || .000 || .748 || style="background:black;color:white;" | 9.8 || 2.5 || 0.64 || style="background:black;color:white;" | 1.44 || 10.2
|- style="text-align:center;" bgcolor=""
|  || 39 || 39 || 35.3 || .435 || .312 || .812 || 3.4 || style="background:black;color:white;" | 7.9 || 0.90 || 0.72 || style="background:black;color:white;" | 21.8
|-  style="text-align:center; background:#f0f0f0;"
|  || 28 || 0 || 4.4 || .467 || .143 || .500 || 0.8 || 0.5 || 0.18 || 0.21 || 1.1
|- style="text-align:center;" bgcolor=""
|  || 49 || 25 || 23.7 || .368 || .393 || .808 || 2.1 || 4.1 || 0.92 || 0.16 || 9.7
|}
  Statistics with the Chicago Bulls.

Playoffs

Game log

|- style="background:#cfc;"
| 1
| April 28
| Philadelphia
| 
| Derrick Rose (23)
| Joakim Noah (13)
| Derrick Rose (9)
| United Center21,943
| 1–0
|- style="background:#fcc;"
| 2
| May 1
| Philadelphia
| 
| Joakim Noah (21)
| Joakim Noah (8)
| Richard HamiltonJoakim Noah (5)
| United Center22,067
| 1–1
|- style="background:#fcc;"
| 3
| May 4
| @ Philadelphia
| 
| Carlos Boozer (18)
| Carlos Boozer (10)
| Richard Hamilton (7)
| Wells Fargo Center20,381
| 1–2
|- style="background:#fcc;"
| 4
| May 6
| @ Philadelphia
| 
| Carlos Boozer (23)
| Taj Gibson (12)
| C.J. WatsonCarlos Boozer (4)
| Wells Fargo Center20,412
| 1–3
|- style="background:#cfc;"
| 5
| May 8
| Philadelphia
| 
| Luol Deng (24)
| Carlos Boozer (13)
| C.J. Watson (7)
| United Center22,093
| 2–3
|- style="background:#fcc;"
| 6
| May 10
| @ Philadelphia
| 
| Luol Deng, Richard Hamilton (19)
| Luol Deng (17)
| C. J. Watson (10)
| Wells Fargo Center20,362
| 2–4

Playoff statistics

|- style="text-align:center;" bgcolor=""
| 
| 6 || 3 || 21.3 || .500 ||  || .353 || 4.7 || 1.3 || .2 || 1.6 || 3.3
|-  style="text-align:center; background:#f0f0f0;"
| 
| 6 || 6 || 33.3 || .422 ||  || .714 || 9.8 || 3.0 || .8 || .3 || 13.5
|- style="text-align:center;" bgcolor=""
| 
| 5 || 0 || 16.6 || .250 ||  || .000 || 3.8 || 1.8 || .8 || .2 || 1.6
|-  style="text-align:center; background:#f0f0f0;"
| 
| 3 || 0 || 1.3 ||  ||  ||  || .0 || .0 || .0 || .0 || .0
|- style="text-align:center;" bgcolor=""
| 
| 6 || 6 || 38.0 || .456 || .364 || .571 || 8.3 || 1.5 || .8 || 1.5 || 14.0
|-  style="text-align:center; background:#f0f0f0;"
| 
| 6 || 0 || 22.8 || .457 ||  || .682 || 6.5 || .7 || .7 || 1.7 || 9.5
|- style="text-align:center;" bgcolor=""
| 
| 6 || 6 || 28.5 || .414 || .333 || .818 || 3.2 || 3.0 || .2 || .0 || 13.0
|-  style="text-align:center; background:#f0f0f0;"
| 
| 6 || 0 || 15.7 || .409 || .308 || .500 || 1.7 || 1.5 || .5 || .5 || 3.8
|- style="text-align:center;" bgcolor=""
| 
| 5 || 0 || 18.8 || .450 || .385 || 1.000 || 1.4 || 1.8 || .0 || .0 || 8.6
|-  style="text-align:center; background:#f0f0f0;"
| 
| 3 || 3 || 15.0 || .731 ||  || .636 || 9.3 || 3.0 || .7 || 1.3 || 15.0
|- style="text-align:center;" bgcolor=""
| 
| 1 || 1 || 37.0 || .391 || .500 || 1.000 || 9.0 || 9.0 || 1.0 || 1.0 || 23.0
|- style="text-align:center;" bgcolor=""
| 
| 6 || 5 || 27.3 || .241 || .250 || .750 || 2.2 || 5.5 || .8 || .0 || 7.3
|}

Awards, records and milestones

Awards

Week/Month
 On January 16, Derrick Rose was named Eastern Conference Player of the Week (January 9 – January 15)
 Coach Tom Thibodeau was named Coach of the Month for December–January.
 Coach Tom Thibodeau was named Eastern Conference Coach of the Month for March, 2012.

All-Star
 Derrick Rose was voted as an All-Star for the 3rd consecutive time, 2nd consecutive time as a starter.
 Luol Deng was voted as an All-Star reserve for the 1st time.
 Coach Tom Thibodeau was selected as Head Coach of the Eastern Conference All-Stars.

Transactions

Overview

Trades

Free agents

Many players signed with teams from other leagues due to the 2011 NBA lockout. FIBA allows players under NBA contracts to sign and play for teams from other leagues if the contracts have opt-out clauses that allow the players to return to the NBA if the lockout ends. The Chinese Basketball Association, however, only allows its clubs to sign foreign free agents who could play for at least the entire season.

See also
 2011–12 NBA season

References

Chicago Bulls seasons
Chicago Bulls
Chicago
Chicago